Christine Egan (20 June 1946 – 11 September 2001) was a Canadian nurse.

Born in Kingston upon Hull, England, Egan immigrated to Canada to work as a nurse in Nunavut. She was killed in the September 11 attacks when visiting the office of Aon Corporation, where her brother Michael Egan worked in the South Tower of World Trade Center. Michael also died in the attacks.

A memorial scholarship was created in her name to support Nunavut Inuit to pursue a nursing education.

References

1946 births
2001 deaths
Canadian nurses
Canadian terrorism victims
Terrorism deaths in New York (state)
Victims of the September 11 attacks
English emigrants to Canada
Canadian women nurses